The 2018 Hódmezővásárhely Ladies Open was a professional tennis tournament played on outdoor clay courts. It was the third edition of the tournament and was part of the 2018 ITF Women's Circuit. It took place in Hódmezővásárhely, Hungary, on 11–17 June 2018.

Singles main draw entrants

Seeds 

 1 Rankings as of 28 May 2018.

Other entrants 
The following players received a wildcard into the singles main draw:
  Anna Bondár
  Réka Luca Jani
  Nina Stojanović
  Panna Udvardy

The following players received entry from the qualifying draw:
  Joana Eidukonytė
  Sofya Lansere
  Tayisiya Morderger
  Nadia Podoroska

The following player received entry as a lucky loser:
  Draginja Vuković

Champions

Singles

 Mariana Duque Mariño def.  Irina Bara, 4–6, 7–5, 6–2

Doubles

 Réka Luca Jani /  Nadia Podoroska def.  Danka Kovinić /  Nina Stojanović, 6–4, 6–4

External links 
 2018 Hódmezővásárhely Ladies Open at ITFtennis.com
 Official website

2018 ITF Women's Circuit
2018 in Hungarian women's sport
Tennis tournaments in Hungary
2018 in Hungarian tennis